The national roads of Belgium are roads that cover the whole of the country; some of the roads are provincial and communal. The use of the national roads is free; they are open to all vehicles, but some are for cars only.

Since the second state reform in 1980, the networks of national roads have been managed by the federal regions, depending on the region in which they are located.

In general the road names are linked to the surrounding areas; most of these are linked to historical references. For example, the N3 around Liège is known as the "Road to Brussels" in the west of the city and the "Road to Fléron" in the east of the city. Another example is around Brussels, where the N2 is known as the "Road to Leuven" ("Chaussée de Louvain" in French, "Leuvensesteenweg" in Dutch).

The numbering of the roads is grouped into four networks of roads:
 The roads N1 to N9 are large connections, starting from Brussels to the borders of the country in each direction. These roads are numbered clockwise.
 In between are roads with numbers N10, N20, N30, etc., which are short connections between two N roads of the first network and located in different provinces.
 There are other important roads having numbers N11, N12, etc., up to N99.
 Lastly, there are local N roads with three digits.

Most of the roads of the third and fourth networks have a first digit that identifies the province: N1xx for Antwerp, N2xx for ex Brabant, N3xx for West Flanders, N4xx for East Flanders, N5xx for Hainaut, N6xx for Liège, N7xx for Limburg, N8xx for Luxemburg and N9xx for Namur. This first digit corresponds with the NIS code of the provinces.

Some short roads have the number of another N road suffixed with a letter of the alphabet. These are usually a short road connecting to an N road, a part of that N road, or a road that can be taken as an alternative to that N road.

First network 
The first network consists of national roads, each starting from the capital Brussels and forming a clockwise star.

Second network 
The second network groups the national roads that are linked to major cities and towns of Belgium, excluding Brussels.

Third network 
The third network is composed of provincial national roads. The first digit corresponds to a province—from 1 to 9—based upon the old provinces and in alphabetical order in French, thus:  Province of Antwerp;  Province of Brabant;  Province of West Flanders;  Province of East Flanders;  Province of Hainaut;  Province of Liège;  Province of Limburg;  Province of Luxemburg; and  Province of Namur.

Province of Antwerp

Province of Brabant

Province of West Flanders

Province of East Flanders

Province of Hainaut 

†Due to linguistic differences, the national road N58 took more than twenty years to build. It does not actually run from Dottignies to Armentières as anticipated because the road is split into two sections: the first stretches from Armentières in France up to Menen where it joins onto the A19 motorway; the other part starts in the village of Dronkaard to the southeast of Menen, and ends in the village of Dottignies.

Province of Liège

Province of Limburg

Province of Luxemburg

Province of Namur

Fourth network 
The fourth network consists of national secondary roads. The first digit corresponds to the province, as for the third network.

National Roads